7T or 7-T may refer to:

7T, IATA code for Tobruk Air
7T's Records
Ohio State Route 7T; see Ohio State Route 7
Arkansas Highway 7T
OnePlus 7T and 7T Pro, Android-based smartphones manufactured by OnePlus.
Algeria (aircraft registration prefix 7T)
Seven Tesla MRI magnet

See also
T7 (disambiguation)